The Centre for Curating the Archive (CCA), at the University of Cape Town, began life as LLAREC (The Lucy Lloyd Archive, Resource and Exhibition Centre) in 1996 as a space in which material, both original and reproduced, created and found, was collected from a variety of archives, museums, collections, storerooms, offices and junk heaps and used creatively to curate exhibitions by artist-staff at The Michaelis School of Fine Art. In 2008 it expanded its activities to include a photographic unit, and it is now a centre which actively works with many different kinds of collections, developing curatorship as a creative site of knowledge. Projects, publications and courses aim, through practice, to open up novel combinations of the historically separated domains of the creative arts and the truth-claiming discourses of history and the social and natural sciences.

The CCA is located in the Old Medical School Building on the Hiddingh Campus in the city of Cape Town. It neighbours the Iziko South African Museum and South African National Gallery, the Company Gardens of Cape Town, The Labia Theatre  and the Drama Department of UCT. The CCA includes spaces for conservation, digital workstations, photographic reproduction, storage, documentation, the planning and constructing of exhibitions, research and teaching.

Fundamental to the work of the CCA is the recognised need to both conserve and make collections accessible to artists, scholars and students. This is achieved through careful curatorship and high-quality digital documentation of collections; developing web-access, publications and the staging of exhibitions and public events. At the heart of the Centre is the understanding of collections and archives as important sites of knowledge, as products of traditions of art, ideas and values, as well as of the social and political circumstances of both their making and reception. The CCA works with several institutions in the realisation of its projects and curates exhibitions both in South Africa and abroad.

References

External links
 CCA Homepage
 https://web.archive.org/web/20130203081738/http://www.humanities.uct.ac.za/research/groupings/llarec/

University of Cape Town